This is a list of the Nepal national football team results from 2010 to present.

Results

2011

2012

2013

2014

2015

2016

2017

2018

2019

2020

2021

2022

See also
 Nepal national football team (1972–1989)
 Nepal national football team (1990–2009)

References 

Results
2010s in Nepalese sport